Carabus albrechti okumurai is a subspecies of ground beetle in the family Carabidae that is endemic to Japan.

References

albrechti okumurai
Beetles described in 1966
Endemic fauna of Japan